Adisura litarga is a species of moth of the family Noctuidae. It is found on Sulawesi and in Queensland.

External links
 Australian Faunal Directory

Heliothinae
Moths of Indonesia
Moths of Australia
Moths described in 1920